Firhøj station is a railway station serving the settlements of Firhøj and Munkerup near Gilleleje in North Zealand, Denmark.

The station is located on the Hornbæk Line from Helsingør to Gilleleje. The train services are currently operated by the railway company Lokaltog which runs frequent local train services between Helsingør station and Gilleleje station.

History 
The station opened in 1916 as the Helsingør-Hornbæk railway line from Helsingør along the coast of the Øresund to Hornbæk was continued from Hornbæk station onwards along the coast to Gilleleje.

In 1997, two trains collided frontally in a head-on collision after one passed a red signal leaving Firhøj station. Both drivers were killed.

References

Citations

Bibliography

External links
Lokaltog

Railway stations in the Capital Region of Denmark
Railway stations opened in 1916
1916 establishments in Denmark
Buildings and structures in Gribskov Municipality
Railway stations in Denmark opened in the 20th century